Rafael Ángel Souto Castro (born 24 October 1930) is a Uruguayan football forward who played for Uruguay in the 1954 FIFA World Cup. He also played for Club Nacional de Football.

References

External links
 FIFA profile

1930 births
Possibly living people
Footballers from Montevideo
Uruguayan footballers
Uruguay international footballers
Association football forwards
Uruguayan Primera División players
Club Nacional de Football players
1954 FIFA World Cup players